Julia Hauser (born 21 February 1994) is an Austrian triathlete. She competed in the women's event at the 2016 Summer Olympics. In 2021, she competed in the women's event at the 2020 Summer Olympics held in Tokyo, Japan, but did not finish. She was also scheduled to compete in the mixed relay event but the Austrian team did not start.

References

External links
 
 

1994 births
Living people
Austrian female triathletes
Olympic triathletes of Austria
Triathletes at the 2016 Summer Olympics
Triathletes at the 2020 Summer Olympics
Sportspeople from Vienna
21st-century Austrian women